The 2002 San Jose State Spartans football team represented San Jose State University in the 2002 NCAA Division I-A football season. Members of the Western Athletic Conference (WAC), the Spartans were led by second-year head coach Fitz Hill and played their home games at Spartan Stadium. The Spartans finished the season 6–7, 4–4 in WAC play, to finish in fourth place. Although they improved from a 3–9 season in 2001, the Spartans did not participate in a bowl game, despite finishing with a 6-7 record.

Personnel

Coaching staff

Final roster

Schedule

Sources:

Game summaries

vs. Arkansas State

at No. 14 Washington

at Stanford

at Illinois

UTEP

at SMU

at No. 5 Ohio State

at Nevada

Boise State

at Hawaii

Louisiana Tech

at Tulsa

Fresno State

References

San Jose State
San Jose State Spartans football seasons
San Jose State Spartans football